Eddie: Strongman is a 2015 British documentary film directed by Matt Bell. It follows the life of English strongman Eddie Hall as he strives to become the World's Strongest Man, which he later achieved in 2017. The film provides a unique insight into the extreme lifestyle of an international strongman and the sacrifices he must make to achieve his goals. It features appearances from Arnold Schwarzenegger, Brian Shaw, Žydrūnas Savickas, Hafþór Júlíus Björnsson, Benedikt Magnússon, Terry Hollands, and Geoff Capes.

References

External links
 

2015 films
2015 documentary films
British documentary films
2010s English-language films
2010s British films